Haidarabad is a village and large market place in Bangladesh. It is situated in Andicot Union, Muradnagar Upazila, Comilla District of the Chittagong Division. Approximately 4463 people live in Haidarabad.

Education 

There are six educational institutions in Haidarabad. They are Haidarabad Hazi E. A. B. High School,

Public offices 

The economical importance and convenient communication with comilla city make Haidarabad one of the significant place in the region. This is why it has several important public offices like Andicot Union council office and Regional agricultural center is situated in the southern part of the Haidarabad Bazar. Because of the commercial importance and for the easier access to the local business man, a branch of government bank Bangladesh Krishi Bank is situated here.  is also located in the southern part of the Haidarabad Bazar.

References

External links 
Muradnagar Upzilla
Bangladesh Janta Review

Populated places in Cumilla District
Villages in Comilla District
Villages in Chittagong Division